Judith Fox (born 1959, in Newcastle, New South Wales) is an Australian novelist.  She grew up in Newcastle, attended the University of Technology, Sydney, and now works as the CEO of the Australian Shareholders' Association.

Awards and nominations

  1994 - Bracelet Honeymyrtle was shortlisted for The Australian/Vogel Literary Award
  1996 - Bracelet Honeymyrtle was shortlisted for the Miles Franklin Award

Bibliography

Novels

  Bracelet Honeymyrtle (1995)
  Scraping Through Stone (2002)

References 

1959 births
Australian women novelists
Living people
20th-century Australian novelists
20th-century Australian women writers